The necklaced barbet (Psilopogon auricularis) is an Asian barbet species occurring in Laos and southern Vietnam, where it inhabits subtropical, lowland tropical moist forests and montane forests up to an altitude of .

Cyanops franklinii auricularis was the scientific name proposed by Herbert C. Robinson and C. Boden Kloss in 1919 for a barbet collected at the Langbian Plateau in southern Vietnam.

References

necklaced barbet
Birds of Laos
Birds of Vietnam
necklaced barbet